Isaiya Katoa (born 18 August 2004) is a Tonga international rugby league footballer who plays as a  or  for the Dolphins in the NRL.

Background
Katoa was born in Wellington, New Zealand to a family of Tongan and Cook Islands descent. He moved to Sydney at nine years of age where he was educated at Barker College, Hornsby and played junior rugby league for Glenmore Park Brumbies alongside future NRL player Joseph Sua'ali'i.

Playing career

Club career
Katoa was contracted to the Penrith Panthers as a junior coming through the ranks, before signing with the Dolphins on the day of his 18th birthday for their inaugural 2023 NRL season.

International career
In 2022 Katoa was named in the Tonga squad for the 2021 Rugby League World Cup.

References

External links

Tonga profile
Rugby League Project profile

2004 births
Living people
People educated at Barker College
Dolphins (NRL) players
New Zealand rugby league players
New Zealand sportspeople of Tongan descent
Tonga national rugby league team players
Rugby league five-eighths
Rugby league players from Wellington City